Cairn Homes is an Irish house-builder and developer focusing on the Greater Dublin Area and other major urban areas of Ireland. The company is listed on Euronext Dublin and is a constituent member of the ISEQ 20 with a market capitalisation of €972m as of 20 February 2020.

The company completed the sale of 1,080 residential units in 2019 making it the largest residential construction company in Ireland by number of units completed.

The company also has a secondary listing on the London stock exchange.

Financial Performance

References

External links
 

Real estate companies of Ireland
Irish companies established in 2015
Companies listed on Euronext Dublin
Companies based in Dublin (city)
Property companies of Ireland